General Kelley may refer to:

Benjamin Franklin Kelley (1807–1891), Union Army brigadier general
Harrison Kelley (1836–1897), Kansas State Militia brigadier general
Jay W. Kelley (born 1941) U.S. Air Force lieutenant general
Paul X. Kelley (1928–2019), U.S. Marine Corps four-star general
Robert E. Kelley (1933–2021), U.S. Air Force lieutenant general
Roy S. Kelley (1915–1993), U.S. Army brigadier general

See also
General Kelly (disambiguation)